Tales of the Supernatural is a 2014 British horror film. It is a portmanteau film consisting of six short tales. Segments are written by Steven M. Smith, Daniel Johnson and Matt Dickinson and directed by Steven M. Smith and Daniel Johnson. The cast includes Bruce Payne, Jon Campling and Jon-Paul Gates. It is planned for release on 17 October 2014 on DVD and VOD worldwide through Monarch Films Inc and Greenway Entertainment.

Plot
The film consists of six supernatural tales (Disturbance, The Hike, Bryan's Daughter, The Book, Naked and Paralysis) linked together by a demon who is intent on collecting human souls.

Cast
 Bruce Payne as Father Doyle 
 Jon Campling as the Demon
 Giles Alderson as Dominic Mears
 Jon-Paul Gates as Andrew Flemming
 Victoria Pritchard as Hannah Flemming (segment Disturbance)
 Steven M. Smith as Hiker 2 (segment The Hike)
 Olivia Jewson as Mary (segment "The Hike")
 Aiste Gramantaite as Childminder (segment "Bryan's Daughter")
 Laura Penneycard as Kate Mears
 Juliet Lundholm as Lucy
 Lynsey Pow as Julia Caskin (segment "The Book")
 Debra Baker as Stephanie (segment "Bryan's Daughter")
 Jeremy Hill as The Tall Man (segment "The Hike")
 Joe Shefer as Michael (segment "The Hike")
 Nina Hatchwell as Angela (segment "Paralysis")
 Mia Baker as Mia (segment "Bryan's Daughter")
 Patrick Rowe as Young Priest
 Emma Claire Beckett as The Secretary / killer (segment "The Book")
 Stephanie Covell as Daughter (segment "The Book")
 Maria J.J. Smith as Little Girl (segment "The Hike")
 Toni Brooks as Sally (segment "The Hike")

Reception

Sean Evans gave the film one star out of five and stated that it contained a 'rocky and quite frankly disjointed storyline'.

References

External links
 

British horror films
2014 films
2014 horror films
2010s English-language films
2010s British films